Larry Dean may refer to:

Larry Dean (gridiron football) (born 1988), gridiron football linebacker
Larry Dean (comedian) (born 1989), Scottish stand-up comedian

See also
 Larry Deen (born 1948), Louisiana sheriff